Indigofera howellii is a species of flowering plant in the family Fabaceae, native to south-central China, Tibet, and Myanmar. Its cultivar 'Reginald Cory' has gained the Royal Horticultural Society's Award of Garden Merit. The species is named in honour of Edward Butts Howell.

References

howellii
Flora of South-Central China
Flora of Tibet
Flora of Myanmar
Plants described in 1920
Taxa named by William Grant Craib
Taxa named by William Wright Smith